The Stoclet Palace is a mansion in Brussels, Belgium. It was designed by the Austrian architect Josef Hoffmann for the Belgian financier Adolphe Stoclet. Built between 1905 and 1911 in the Vienna Secession style, it is located at 279–281, Avenue de Tervueren/Tervurenlaan, in the Woluwe-Saint-Pierre municipality of Brussels. Considered Hoffman's masterpiece, the residence is one of the 20th century's most refined and luxurious private houses.

The sumptuous dining and music rooms of the Stoclet Palace exemplified the theatrical spaces of the Gesamtkunstwerk ("total work of art"), celebrating sight, sound, and taste in a symphony of sensual harmonies that paralleled the operas of Richard Wagner, from whom the concept originated. In his designs for the Stoclet Palace, Hoffmann was particularly attuned to fashion and to the Viennese identity of the new style of interior, even designing a dress for Madame Stoclet so that she would not clash with her living room decor as she had while wearing a French Paul Poiret gown.

The mansion is owned by the Stoclet family and is not open to visitors. Until recently no outsider, not even experts helping with restoration were allowed in. The building has received protected status by the Monuments and Sites Directorate of the Brussels-Capital Region, and it was designated as a World Heritage Site by UNESCO in June 2009.

Description

The Stoclet Palace was commissioned by Adolphe Stoclet (1871–1949), a wealthy Belgian financier and art collector. He chose 35-year-old Austrian architect Josef Hoffmann (1870–1956), who was a founding member of the Vienna Secession, a radical group of designers and artists established in 1897. Hoffman abandoned fashions and styles of the past and produced a building that is an asymmetrical compilation of rectangular blocks, underlined by exaggerated lines and corners.

The starkness of the exterior is softened by artistic windows, which break through the line of the eaves, the rooftop conservatory, and bronze sculptures of four nude males by Franz Metzner, which are mounted on the tower that rises above the stairwell. Regimented upright balustrades line the balconies, touched with Art Nouveau ornamentation.

The Stoclet Palace was the first residential project for the Wiener Werkstätte (Vienna Workshops), co-founded by Hoffman in 1903. Josef Hoffman and his colleagues designed every aspect of the mansion, down to the door handles and light fittings. The interior is as austere and at the same time detailed as the exterior, with upright geometrically coordinated furniture and minimal clutter. This was an avant-garde approach, presenting a 'reformed interior' where function dictated form. The integration of architects, artists, and artisans makes Stoclet Palace an example of a Gesamtkunstwerk, one of the defining characteristics of Art Nouveau. Klimt's sketches for the dining room are in the permanent collection of the Museum für angewandte Kunst (MAK) in Vienna.

The Stoclet Palace is located at 279–281, Avenue de Tervueren/Tervurenlaan, in the municipality of Woluwe-Saint-Pierre in Brussels. The building was designed to appear from the road as a stately city mansion. Seen from the garden at the back the Stoclet Palace "becomes a villa suburbana with its rear facade sculpturally modelled by bay windows, balconies and terraces" in the words of architectural historian Annette Freytag, which gave the Stoclet family a building with "all the advantages of a comfortable urban mansion and a country house at the same time."

Adolphe Stoclet died in 1949, and the mansion was inherited by his daughter-in-law Annie Stoclet. Following Annie's death in 2002, the house was inherited by her four daughters. The Stoclet Palace has never been open to the public. Press reports have described the mansion as being looked after by two caretakers while there is dissension between Stoclet's four granddaughters as to the future of the Stoclet Palace.

See also
 Villa Empain
 Art Nouveau in Brussels
 Art Deco in Brussels
 History of Brussels
 Belgium in "the long nineteenth century"

References

Notes

Bibliography

  Rare collection of 52 B/W pictures from the exterior, the interior and the gardens of the Stoclet Palace taken in the years following the completion of the building.

Further reading

External links

 
 Exhibition of Klimt's work for Stoclet House at MAK.at
 Article and large selection of pictures of the Stoclet Palace

Palaces in Brussels
Woluwe-Saint-Pierre
Protected heritage sites in Brussels
World Heritage Sites in Belgium
Art Nouveau houses
Art Nouveau architecture in Brussels
Art Deco architecture in Belgium
Houses completed in 1911
Wiener Werkstätte